Yet Another Scientific Artificial Reality Application (YASARA) is a computer program for molecular visualising, modelling, and dynamics. It has many scientific uses, as expressed by the large number of scientific articles mentioning the software. The free version of YASARA is well suited to bioinformatics education. A series of freely available bioinformatics courses exist that use this software.  See the Center for Molecular and Biomolecular Informatics (CMBI) education pages for a series of examples.

Modelling:
Dynamics:

See also
 List of molecular graphics systems
 Comparison of software for molecular mechanics modeling
 Molecular graphics
 Molecular design software

References

External links

Molecular modelling software
Molecular dynamics software